Fernando Almeida de Oliveira (born 18 June 1978), known as just Fernando, is a Brazilian football player who currently plays for Vitória.

Club statistics

References

External links

http://awx.jp/cgi/prof/prof.cgi?player=fernando

1978 births
Living people
Brazilian footballers
Brazilian expatriate footballers
Esporte Clube Vitória players
Cruzeiro Esporte Clube players
Club Athletico Paranaense players
Al Ahli SC (Doha) players
Campeonato Brasileiro Série A players
J1 League players
Kashima Antlers players
Expatriate footballers in Japan
Expatriate footballers in Qatar
Expatriate footballers in Saudi Arabia
Association football midfielders